Into the Light is a compilation album from Nuclear Blast Records to commemorate their 20 years as a record label. Produced by Rage guitarist Victor Smolski, with singers Tobias Sammet (of Edguy), Peter "Peavy" Wagner (Rage) - who has also written the lyrics for all songs -, Tony Kakko (Sonata Arctica), Mats Levén (Therion), Marcel "Schmier" Schirmer (Destruction), Hansi Kürsch (Blind Guardian), Andi Deris (Helloween), Oddleif Stensland (Communic), Marko Hietala (ex-Nightwish, ex-Tarot), and Tarja Turunen (Ex-Nightwish). It features a variable collection of "All Stars" much in the same vein as Roadrunner United. The whole album was written by Victor Smolski (however, two songs, "In the Picture" and "Slaves to the Desert" – originally "Slaves of the Desert" – are remakes of songs he had already recorded with Mind Odyssey), who also recorded all the guitars, some bass and keyboards. The drums were done by Volker Schultz and André Hilgers.

It was followed by a "twin" album called Out of the Dark. "Into the Light" focuses on the Power Metal side of Nuclear Blast, "Out of the Dark" on their Melodic Death side.

Tarja Turunen is the only singer in the album that is not (and wasn't at that time either) from Nuclear Blast. She is only included because of her past with Nightwish, one of the best known bands from Nuclear Blast.

Track listing

Disc 1 - 20 Years Nuclear Blast

Disc 2 - 20 Years Nuclear Blast: Bonus CD
HammerFall - Hearts on Fire (03:54)
Helloween - The Madness of the Crowds (04:14)
Gotthard - El Traidor (03:36)
After Forever - Sweet Enclosure (05:05)
Ride the Sky - New Protection (03:23)
Thunderstone - Forevermore (04:21)
Threshold - Slipstream (04:55)
Amorphis - The Smoke (03:39)
Candlemass - Devil Seed (05:45)
Sirenia - The Other Side (03:55)
Total length: 42:43

Personnel
Victor Smolski - guitars, bass & keyboards
Volker Schultz - drums
André Hilgers - drums

2007 albums
Nuclear Blast albums